Düğün Dernek 2: Sünnet is a 2015 Turkish comedy film written and directed by Selçuk Aydemir and starring Ahmet Kural, Murat Cemcir, Rasim Öztekin and Şinasi Yurtsever.

Plot 
İsmail, who had his son married in the first movie, now wants to have his grandson circumcised. As in the first movie, the entire team, especially Fikret, Çetin and İsmail, gather and start preparations for the circumcision ceremony. This ceremony eventually turns into a city-wide event.

Cast 
 Ahmet Kural - Tüpçü Fikret
 Murat Cemcir - Çetin (Çeto)
 Rasim Öztekin - İsmail
 Barış Yıldız - Muallim Saffet 
 Devrim Yakut - Hatice 
 Şinasi Yurtsever - Yılmaz
 İnan Ulaş Torun - Damat Tarık
 Açalya Samyeli Danoğlu - Receptionist Leyla
 Erdal Tosun - Crazy Doctor
 Ayhan Taş - Fake Doctor and Leyla's father
 Nükhet Duru - Herself
 Mustafa Keser - Himself
 Hakan Akın - Mayor
 Jelena Bozic - Monica
 Deniz Erayvaz - Matias
 Juris Strenga - Leton Dede
 Zahide Yetiş - Doctor
 Ali İhsan Varol - Circumciser
 Ertugrul Gültekin - Tüpçü Çırağı
 Tuğçe Kursunoğlu - Girl in the lobby
 Ferit Aktuğ - Commissioner
 Tuna Kirli - Burglar
 Giray Altınok - Burglar
 Alper Kadayıfçı - Burglar

Release 
The movie was first shown in 1200 theaters across Turkey, but this number increased 1400 as the film was well-received by the audience. It was watched by 1,380,122 people in its first three days of release and grossed a total of 16,795,440.73 in this 3-day period. It became the most watched movie in Turkey in 2015.

References

External links 
 
 Düğün Dernek 2: Sünnet on Facebook
 Düğün Dernek 2: Sünnet on YouTube
 Düğün Dernek 2: Sünnet on Twitter

2015 comedy films
Turkish comedy films
Turkish sequel films
Films set in Turkey
Films set in Latvia